Rui Filipe da Cunha Faria (born 14 June 1975) is a Portuguese football coach, known for his work with football manager José Mourinho for 17 years.

Biography

Early life
Faria was born in Balugães, a tiny parish of Barcelos in Portugal. Like Mourinho, he was a physical education graduate who had not played football at a high level.

Faria's education took him to a seminar day at the Camp Nou, Barcelona's home stadium, where Mourinho was working as assistant manager to Louis van Gaal. Mourinho saw a kindred spirit in Faria, and when he took the União de Leiria job in April 2001, he hired Faria as his assistant and fitness coach.

Coaching career
Faria's early time at Leiria, emblematic of Mourinho's new fitness regime, led to a stand-off with the club's directors. Since then, the two have been inseparable, with Faria joining Porto in January 2002, Mourinho's first month in charge of his new club. He was part of the club's staff for their 2003 league, cup and UEFA Cup treble and won the UEFA Champions League in 2004 with the club. Faria then followed Mourinho to Chelsea that summer along with assistant manager Baltemar Brito, chief scout André Villas-Boas and goalkeeping coach Silvino Louro. He became ubiquitous in his Chelsea tracksuit on the London side's bench.

Faria left Chelsea in late 2007, following Mourinho out of the club, and joined him at Internazionale in the summer of 2008. In June 2009, André Villas-Boas left to manage Académica de Coimbra (later following in Mourinho's footsteps by taking over Porto, then Chelsea) and was replaced at Inter by José Morais. After winning the Serie A in their first season, the side completed a high-profile treble of league, cup and Champions League in 2010. Since the 2010–11 season, Faria was the assistant coach of Real Madrid, moving to the club along with Mourinho, Morais and Louro. Faria followed Mourinho back to Chelsea, when he was confirmed as the manager in June 2013.

He has worked alongside Mourinho since 2002, a period that had seen the manager and his staff fail to lose a league game at home in eight years, the run ending with a 0–1 defeat to Sporting de Gijón whilst with Real Madrid. Mourinho described Faria as his "methodology right arm, the guy that understands best my information and the way I work".

In April 2014, Faria was sent from the dugout by referee Mike Dean following the coach's aggressive behaviour to the official during Chelsea's home defeat to Sunderland. He was charged with using abusive and insulting words. He received a four-match stadium ban after appealing against a six-match ban.

Faria once again was appointed as Mourinho's assistant upon his appointment at Manchester United in 2016. In May 2018, Faria resigned as assistant manager of Manchester United to spend more time with his family, ending his 17 year partnership with Mourinho.

On 18 January 2019, Faria was appointed manager of Qatar Stars League club Al-Duhail, his first full management position. He resigned from his role one year later.

Controversy
As with his long-time manager, colleague and friend Mourinho, Faria has been the subject of controversy in the media. In a match against Reading in 2006, where Chelsea goalkeeper Petr Čech received a severe blow to the head, Faria was sent off alongside Chelsea midfielder Mikel John Obi.

In a 2005 Champions League quarter-final match against Bayern Munich, where Mourinho was suspended for Chelsea, Faria was seen wearing a woolly hat and scratching his ear enough to elicit suspicions that Mourinho was covertly communicating with his fitness coach.

At Real Madrid, Faria was said to have been party to an altercation with Sporting de Gijón manager Manuel Preciado after a match between the two clubs in November 2010.

In April 2014, Faria was dismissed from the Chelsea bench during the home defeat against Sunderland when he made comments to the fourth official complaining about a penalty that had been awarded to Sunderland. It was alleged he had used "abusive and/or insulting words". The match resulted in Chelsea's first-ever Premier League loss at Stamford Bridge under Mourinho.

Personal life
Faria is married and is a father to three children.

Honours

As assistant coach
As an assistant coach, including a sabbatical in 2007–08, Faria's club sides have won their domestic league eight times, the UEFA Cup once and the Champions League twice. Between 2002 and 2012, Mourinho and Faria did not go a full season or a calendar year without winning at least one trophy.

Porto
2002–03 Primeira Liga
2002–03 Taça de Portugal
2002–03 UEFA Cup
2003 Supertaça Cândido de Oliveira
2003–04 Primeira Liga
2003–04 UEFA Champions League

Chelsea
2004–05 FA Premier League
2004–05 League Cup
2005 FA Community Shield
2005–06 FA Premier League
2006–07 League Cup
2006–07 FA Cup

Internazionale
2008 Supercoppa Italiana
2008–09 Serie A
2009–10 Serie A
2009–10 Coppa Italia
2009–10 UEFA Champions League

Real Madrid
2010–11 Copa del Rey
2011–12 La Liga
2012 Supercopa de España

Chelsea
2014–15 League Cup
2014–15 Premier League

Manchester United
2016 FA Community Shield
2016–17 EFL Cup
2016–17 UEFA Europa League

The Treble
(League, Cup and European trophies)
2002–03 with Porto: League, Cup and UEFA Cup
2009–10 with Inter Milan: League, Cup and UEFA Champions League

As head coach
Al-Duhail
Qatar Emir Cup: 2019

References

1975 births
Living people
People from Barcelos, Portugal
University of Porto alumni
Portuguese football managers
Chelsea F.C. non-playing staff
Real Madrid CF non-playing staff
Manchester United F.C. non-playing staff
Al-Duhail SC managers
Portuguese expatriate football managers
Portuguese expatriate sportspeople in England
Portuguese expatriate sportspeople in Italy
Portuguese expatriate sportspeople in Spain
Portuguese expatriate sportspeople in Qatar
Expatriate football managers in Qatar
Association football coaches
Sportspeople from Braga District